The Shatuo Dam is a gravity dam on the Wu River in Yanhe Country, Guizhou Province, China.

Construction
The ground-breaking ceremony for the dam was held on June 28, 2006, and excavation commenced soon thereafter. In 2008, after the original river closure, part of the dam failed due to the karst foundation, had to be repaired. On April 19, 2009, the river was closed and the reservoir began to fill. All four generators were commissioned by 13 June 2013. A vertical ship lift is planned for the dam as well, its expected completion is in 2020.

See also 

 List of power stations in China

References

Hydroelectric power stations in Guizhou
Dams in China
Dams completed in 2009
Dams on the Wu River
Gravity dams
Energy infrastructure completed in 2013